Kokia drynarioides, commonly known as Hawaiian tree cotton, is a species of flowering plant in the mallow family, Malvaceae, that is endemic to the Big Island of Hawaii. Associated plants include āheahea (Chenopodium oahuense), aalii (Dodonaea viscosa), hala pepe (Pleomele hawaiiensis), wiliwili (Erythrina sandwicensis), uhiuhi (Caesalpinia kavaiensis), kōlea (Myrsine lanaiensis), aiea (Nothocestrum latifolium), kuluī (Nototrichium sandwicense), ālaa (Pouteria sandwicensis), ohe kukuluāeo (Reynoldsia sandwicensis), māmane (Sophora chrysophylla), and maua (Xylosma hawaiensis var. hillebrandii). It is threatened by habitat loss and competition with invasive species, such as fountain grass (Pennisetum setaceum).

References

External links

 United States Botanic Garden: Kokia drynarioides

drynarioides
Endemic flora of Hawaii
Biota of Hawaii (island)
Plants described in 1912
Taxonomy articles created by Polbot